The 1994–95 NBA season was the Spurs' 19th season in the National Basketball Association, and 28th season as a franchise. During the off-season, the Spurs hired Bob Hill as head coach, re-acquired Sean Elliott after playing one year with the Detroit Pistons, re-signed Avery Johnson after one season with the Golden State Warriors, and signed free agents Chuck Person, and former All-Star forward Moses Malone. Early into the season, they signed free agent Doc Rivers, who was previously released by the New York Knicks. With Dennis Rodman serving two suspensions early into the season, the Spurs struggled and played below .500 with a 7–9 start. However, they would win 13 of their next 14 games, hold a 30–15 record at the All-Star break, then later on post a 15-game winning streak between March and April, and win 21 of their final 23 games, finishing with the league's best record of 62–20. It was also their best regular season record in franchise history, surpassing the 56-win 1989–90 season, which would be surpassed 11 seasons later by the 2005-06 team (63-19), then 10 seasons later by the 2015-16 squad (67-15).

David Robinson averaged 27.6 points, 10.8 rebounds and 3.2 blocks per game, and was named Most Valuable Player of the Year, and made the All-NBA First Team. He was also selected for the 1995 NBA All-Star Game. In addition, Rodman, who only played just 49 games, contributed 7.1 points, and led the league with 16.8 rebounds per game, and was named to the All-NBA Third Team, while Elliott finished second on the team in scoring with 18.1 points per game, Johnson provided the team with 13.4 points, 8.2 assists and 1.4 steals per game, and Vinny Del Negro contributed 12.5 points per game. Off the bench, Person played a sixth man role, averaging 10.8 points per game and led the team with 172 three-point field-goals, while J.R. Reid averaged 7.0 points and 4.9 rebounds per game, and Terry Cummings provided with 6.8 points and 5.0 rebounds per game. Both Robinson and Rodman were selected to the NBA All-Defensive First Team. Robinson also finished in fourth place in Defensive Player of the Year voting, while Rodman finished in fifth place, and Person finished in third place in Sixth Man of the Year voting.

In the Western Conference First Round of the playoffs, the Spurs swept the Denver Nuggets in three straight games. In the Western Conference Semi-finals, they defeated the 5th-seeded Los Angeles Lakers in six games. However, in the Western Conference Finals, they would lose to the 6th-seeded and defending champion Houston Rockets in six games. The Rockets would go on to defeat the Orlando Magic in four straight games in the NBA Finals, winning their second consecutive championship.

Following the season, the Spurs traded Rodman to the Chicago Bulls, no longer being able to handle the distractions that came along with the NBA's top rebounder. Also following the season, Terry Cummings re-signed as a free agent with his former team, the Milwaukee Bucks, while Willie Anderson left in the 1995 NBA Expansion Draft, and Malone, who only played just 17 games this season due to a ruptured tendon in his right leg, retired after playing 19 seasons in the NBA.

Draft picks

Roster

Regular season

Season standings

Season opener delayed
The Spurs' season opener against the Golden State Warriors on November 4, 1994, was delayed more than 50 minutes after the Alamodome's sprinkler system accidentally went off. The cause was a sensor getting triggered by the fireworks display the team put on during the player introductions. Most of those soaked were the fans who were seated in the season ticket area, and they took it in stride. The game eventually went on as scheduled, with Golden State winning 123-118.

Dennis Rodman
Dennis Rodman helped San Antonio to their then-franchise best win–loss record of 62–20, and they made it to the Western Conference finals. However, his increasingly erratic off-court life, including a brief but heavily-publicized relationship with singer Madonna, and on-court antics, such as dyeing his hair and starting on-court arguments resulted in him being traded to the Chicago Bulls after only two years with the Spurs.

Record vs. opponents

Game log

Regular season

|- align="center" bgcolor="#ccffcc"
| 17
| December 10, 19947:30p.m. CST
| @ Houston
| W 108–96
| Johnson (24)
| David Robinson\Robinson (11)
| Johnson (11)
| The Summit16,611
| 8–9
|- align="center" bgcolor="#ccffcc"
| 22
| December 23, 19947:30p.m. CST
| Houston
| W 98–96
| Del Negro (26)
| Reid, Robinson (10)
| Johnson (11)
| Alamodome31,514
| 13–9

|- align="center" bgcolor="#ffcccc"
| 31
| January 13, 19957:30p.m. CST
| @ Houston
| L 100–103
| Robinson (23)
| Robinson (10)
| Johnson (9)
| The Summit16,611
| 20–11
|- align="center" bgcolor="#ccffcc"
| 38
| January 26, 19957:30p.m. CST
| Houston
| W 103–100
| Elliott (26)
| Rodman (22)
| Johnson (11)
| Alamodome33,360
| 24–14

|- align="center"
|colspan="9" bgcolor="#bbcaff"|All-Star Break
|- style="background:#cfc;"
|- bgcolor="#bbffbb"
|- align="center" bgcolor="#ccffcc"
| 49
| February 21, 19957:00p.m. CST
| @ Houston
| W 98–97
| Del Negro (23)
| Rodman (30)
| Johnson (8)
| The Summit16,611
| 33–16

|- align="center" bgcolor="#ccffcc"
| 54
| March 3, 19957:30p.m. CST
| Orlando
| W 112–111
| Robinson (24)
| Rodman (20)
| Johnson (9)
| Alamodome35,818
| 38–16
|- align="center" bgcolor="#ccffcc"
| 55
| March 5, 199512 Noon CST
| Houston
| W 124–103
| Robinson (31)
| Rodman (27)
| Johnson (10)
| Alamodome35,818
| 39–16
|- align="center" bgcolor="#ffcccc"
| 59
| March 12, 199511:00a.m. CST
| @ Orlando
| L 104–110
| Robinson (34)
| Rodman (23)
| Johnson (6)
| Orlando Arena16,010
| 41–18

Playoffs

|- align="center" bgcolor="#ccffcc"
| 1
| April 28
| Denver
| W 104–88
| Sean Elliott (21)
| Dennis Rodman (11)
| Avery Johnson (8)
| Alamodome25,235
| 1–0
|- align="center" bgcolor="#ccffcc"
| 2
| April 30
| Denver
| W 122–96
| Robinson, Rodman (19)
| Dennis Rodman (16)
| Avery Johnson (9)
| Alamodome
| 2–0
|- align="center" bgcolor="#ccffcc"
| 3
| May 2
| @ Denver
| W 99–95
| Robinson, Johnson (24)
| Dennis Rodman (13)
| David Robinson (5)
| McNichols Sports Arena17,171
| 3–0
|-

|- align="center" bgcolor="#ccffcc"
| 1
| May 6
| L.A. Lakers
| W 110–94
| David Robinson (33)
| Dennis Rodman (12)
| Avery Johnson (12)
| Alamodome24,002
| 1–0
|- align="center" bgcolor="#ccffcc"
| 2
| May 8
| L.A. Lakers
| W 97–90 (OT)
| Robinson, Rodman (22)
| Dennis Rodman (22)
| Avery Johnson (9)
| Alamodome26,127
| 2–0
|- align="center" bgcolor="#ffcccc"
| 3
| May 12
| @ L.A. Lakers
| L 85–92
| David Robinson (34)
| David Robinson (13)
| Avery Johnson (8)
| Great Western Forum17,505
| 2–1
|- align="center" bgcolor="#ccffcc"
| 4
| May 14
| @ L.A. Lakers
| W 80–71
| David Robinson (26)
| David Robinson (22)
| Avery Johnson (7)
| Great Western Forum17,505
| 3–1
|- align="center" bgcolor="#ffcccc"
| 5
| May 16
| L.A. Lakers
| L 96–98 (OT)
| David Robinson (34)
| David Robinson (17)
| Avery Johnson (12)
| Alamodome35,888
| 3–2
|- align="center" bgcolor="#ccffcc"
| 6
| May 18
| @ L.A. Lakers
| W 100–88
| David Robinson (31)
| David Robinson (15)
| Avery Johnson (11)
| Great Western Forum17,505
| 4–2
|-

|- align="center" bgcolor="#ffcccc"
| 1
| May 22, 19957:30p.m. CDT
| Houston
| L 93–94
| Elliott (24)
| Rodman (20)
| Johnson (9)
| Alamodome33,337
| 0–1
|- align="center" bgcolor="#ffcccc"
| 2
| May 24, 19957:30p.m. CDT
| Houston
| L 96–106
| Robinson (32)
| Robinson (12)
| Elliott, Anderson (5)
| Alamodome35,888
| 0–2
|- align="center" bgcolor="#ccffcc"
| 3
| May 26, 19958:00p.m. CDT
| @ Houston
| W 107–102
| Robinson (29)
| Rodman (14)
| Johnson (13)
| The Summit16,611
| 1–2
|- align="center" bgcolor="#ccffcc"
| 4
| May 28, 19952:30p.m. CDT
| @ Houston
| W 103–81
| Robinson (20)
| Rodman (19)
| Johnson, Del Negro (4)
| The Summit16,611
| 2–2
|- align="center" bgcolor="#ffcccc"
| 5
| May 30, 19958:00p.m. CDT
| Houston
| L 90–111
| Robinson (22)
| Robinson, Rodman (12)
| Johnson (7)
| Alamodome35,888
| 2–3
|- align="center" bgcolor="#ffcccc"
| 6
| June 1, 19958:00p.m. CDT
| @ Houston
| L 95–100
| Robinson, Johnson (19)
| Rodman (17)
| Johnson (10)
| The Summit16,611
| 2–4
|-

Player statistics

Season

Playoffs

Awards and records
David Robinson, NBA Most Valuable Player
David Robinson, NBA All-Star
David Robinson, All-NBA First Team
David Robinson, All-NBA First Defensive Team
Dennis Rodman, All-NBA First Defensive Team
Dennis Rodman, All-NBA Third Team

Transactions

References

 San Antonio Spurs on Database Basketball
 San Antonio Spurs on Basketball Reference

San Antonio Spurs seasons
San
San Antonio
San Antonio